The 1916 SAPFL Grand Final was an Australian rules football game contested between the Port Adelaide Football Club and the West Torrens Football Club, held at Hindmarsh Oval on Saturday 19 August 1916. It was the 1st Grand Final of the South Australian Patriotic Football League, staged to determine the premiers of the 1916 SAPFL season. The match was won by Port Adelaide by a margin of 34 points, marking that clubs first patriotic premiership victory.

The SAFL was opposed to the formation of the Patriotic League and refused to recognise it during and after World War I. Hindmarsh Oval was the contingency venue for the Grand Final if an agreement with the SACA could not be reached as the Adelaide Oval was the preferred venue of the SAPFL.

Teams

References 

SAPFL Grand Final, 1916